Dunaújvárosi Acélbikák, is a Hungarian ice hockey team that currently plays in the MOL Liga. They play their home games at Dunaújvárosi Jégcsarnok, located in Dunaújváros.

Team Name
Over time the team's name has changed...
1977–2002: Dunaferr
2003–2005: DAC-Invitel
2006–2015: DAB-Docler
2015–present: Dunaújvárosi Acélbikák

Hungarian National Champions
The Dunaújváros Steel Bulls have previously won the OB I bajnokság title four times:
1995-96
1997-98
1999-00
2001-02
2012-13

MOL Liga Champions
The Dunaújváros Steel Bulls have previously won the MOL Liga Champion title two times:
2011-12
 2012-13

2010-2011 season
MOL Liga: Finalists (3-1 series loss to HSC Csíkszereda)
Hungarian Cup: Champions (5-1 win over Vasas HC)
OB I. Championship League: Finalists (4-0 series loss to Sapa Fehérvár AV19).

2011-2012 season
MOL Liga: Champions (4-0 series win to Miskolci JJSE)
Hungarian Cup: Champions (5-0 win over Miskolci JJSE)
OB I. Championship League: Quarter Finalists (4-0 series loss to Sapa Fehérvár AV19).
Austrian National League: Quarter Finalists (series loss to VEU Feldkirch).

2012-2013 season
MOL Liga: Champions (4-2 series win against HSC Csíkszereda)
Hungarian Cup: Bronze Medal

Current roster
Current roster (as of March 1, 2017):

External links
  

Ice hockey teams in Hungary
Erste Liga (ice hockey) teams
Carpathian League teams
Austrian National League teams
Interliga (1999–2007) teams
Dunaújváros